Piers Court is a country house in Stinchcombe on the Cotswold Edge in Gloucestershire, England. A Grade II* listed building, in the mid-20th century the court was home to the novelist Evelyn Waugh.

History
The present house was built by John Wallington at the very end of the 18th century. It incorporates elements of an older building.

Evelyn Waugh lived at Piers Court from 1937 to 1956, and wrote many of his best known works there, including Scoop, Brideshead Revisited, Men at Arms and Officers and Gentlemen. In 1955 Waugh was enraged when two journalists from the Daily Express, Nancy Spain and Noel Buxton arrived at Piers Court, having previously been declined an interview. An acrimonious and public correspondence saw Waugh successfully sue Spain for libel. But his enjoyment of the house was marred and he sold it the following year.  

Waugh’s library at Piers Court was sold by a subsequent owner and the fixtures and fittings, including the prominent bookcases, were sent to the US with the intention of reconstructing the library in a museum. 

In December 2022, the court was sold by auction, for £3.16m. The sales arrangements were unusual, as the presence of sitting tenants precluded potential purchasers from viewing the property.

Architecture and description
The house is built of local stone with the main block consisting of seven bays and two storeys. Historic England's listing record notes that this central block, designed in a Palladian style and dating from the late 18th century, abuts a lower wing with earlier origins, probably of the 16th century. The pediment below the roof is surmounted by an "elaborate" coat of arms. David Verey and Alan Brooks, in their 2000 revised edition of Gloucestershire 1: The Cotswolds, in the Pevsner Buildings of England series, describe Piers Court as a "dignified and elegant house." It was designated a Grade II* listed building in 1952. The adjacent stable block is listed at Grade II.

Notes

References

Sources
 
   
 
  
Country houses in Gloucestershire
Grade II* listed buildings in Gloucestershire
Buildings and structures in Gloucestershire
Grade II* listed houses